Oroktoy is a rural locality (a selo) in Kuyusskoye Rural Settlement of Chemalsky District, the Altai Republic, Russia. The population was 195 as of 2016. There are 5 streets.

Geography 
Oroktoy is located in the valley of the Oroktoy River, 53 km south of Chemal (the district's administrative centre) by road. Kuyus is the nearest rural locality.

References 

Rural localities in Chemalsky District